Harrison's gerbil (Gerbillus mesopotamiae) is a gerbil, a small mammal in the rodent order.  It is distributed mainly in the Tigris-Euphrates Valley in Iraq and western Iran.  It is also known as the Mesopotamian gerbil.

References

 

Gerbillus
Mammals of Asia
Fauna of Iran
Mammals described in 1956